On October 29, 2015, Dynamic Airways Flight 405, a Boeing 767 on a scheduled passenger service from Fort Lauderdale, Florida, to Caracas, Venezuela, suffered a fire while taxiing for departure. All 101 passengers and crew evacuated the aircraft and survived, but twenty-two of them were injured.

Accident
Flight 2D405 caught fire while taxiing for departure at Fort Lauderdale-Hollywood International Airport. The aircraft was leaking fuel shortly before it caught fire, according to the pilots of an aircraft that was following Flight 405. All passengers and crew evacuated the aircraft. 22 were taken to a local hospital to be treated for injuries. There were no burn injuries. A 62 year old man suffered serious injuries after falling from an evacuation slide. 21 others were admitted to the hospital for abrasions, anxiety, and minor seat-belt injuries. The airport's two runways were closed. The south runway reopened around 3:20 PM. Dynamic Airways continue to operate Flight 405 on the Fort Lauderdale - Caracas route.

Aircraft
The aircraft involved in the incident (c/n 23280) was a Boeing 767-269ER with registration N251MY. The 131st Boeing 767 built, it first flew on January 30, 1986 and was delivered to Kuwait Airways approximately seven weeks later. While owned by Kuwait Airways, the airframe was leased at times to EgyptAir, Qatar Airways and Polynesian Airlines.

In 1995, Kuwait Airways sold the airframe to Birgenair, which subsequently leased the airframe to Alas Nacionales and LAN Airlines. Following the collapse of Birgenair shortly after the crash of Birgenair Flight 301, Air Gabon acquired the airframe for two years until its acquisition by First Security Corporation (now part of Wells Fargo) in 1999. The plane was then stored for the next five years out of service until United Arab Emirates-based Phoenix Aviation (later AVE.com) purchased the frame from Wells Fargo in 2004, leasing it to Kam Air in early 2004.

Current owner KMW Leasing of Salt Lake City, Utah (owned by the founder and former CEO of Extra Space Storage, who in turn also is a part-owner of Dynamic Airways) acquired the plane from AVE.com in June 2006, who subsequently leased the airframe on a "power by the hour" basis to MAXjet and Sunny Airways prior to its placement with Dynamic. Despite its age of nearly 30 years, as of October 6, 2015, the airframe had only flown for 29,970 hours over 9,937 flight cycles. Previous to being leased by Dynamic Airways, the aircraft was in dry storage for approximately 29 months. Dynamic had only logged 240 hours during the six-week period prior to the fire at Fort Lauderdale.

Investigation
The National Transportation Safety Board (NTSB) has begun an investigation. On November 3, 2015, the NTSB released an update to its ongoing investigation, which stated that they found that the main fuel supply line coupling assembly had disconnected in the wing-to-engine strut above and behind the left engine. Examination of the left engine revealed no evidence of an engine uncontainment or other failure. Also, the lower inboard portion of the left wing, left engine cowling, and left fuselage center section sustained thermal damage. The fire did not penetrate the fuselage. The report condemned some passengers for taking their luggage.

The final report on the accident was released on June 1, 2020. The report concluded that the failure of the main fuel line coupling assembly was "the failure of maintenance personnel to install the required safety lock wire." The NTSB also criticized the flight crew for initiating the emergency evacuation while the right engine was still running.

Notes

References

2015 in Florida
Accidents and incidents involving the Boeing 767
Aviation accidents and incidents in the United States in 2015
Aviation accidents and incidents in Florida
Dynamic Airways accidents and incidents
Fort Lauderdale–Hollywood International Airport
October 2015 events in the United States
Airliner accidents and incidents caused by maintenance errors